Nootkatone is a natural organic compound, a sesquiterpenoid, and a ketone that is the most important and expensive aromatic of grapefruit, and which also occurs in other organisms.

Previously, nootkatone was thought to be one of the main chemical components of the smell and flavour of grapefruits. In high purity, it usually is found as colorless crystals. Crude extractives are liquid, viscous, and yellow.  Nootkatone typically is extracted from grapefruit through the chemical or biochemical oxidation of valencene. It is found in Alaska yellow cedar trees, as well as in vetiver grass.

Mechanism of action
As is true of other plant terpenoids, nootkatone activates α-adrenergic type 1 octopamine receptor (PaOA1) in susceptible arthropods, causing fatal spasms.

Natural origin
Nootkatone was isolated from the wood of the Alaskan yellow cedar, Cupressus nootkatensis. The species name, nootkatensis, is derived from the language of the Nuu-Chah-Nulth people of Canada (formerly referred to as the Nootka people).

Uses
Nootkatone in spray form has been shown as an effective repellent or insecticide against deer ticks and lone star ticks. It is also an effective repellent or insecticide against mosquitos, and may repel bed bugs, head lice, and other insects. It is an environmentally friendly insecticide because it is a volatile essential oil that does not persist in the environment. It was approved by the U.S. EPA for this use on August 10, 2020. Its ability to repel ticks, mosquitoes, and other insects may last for hours, in contrast to other plant-based oil repellants like citronella, peppermint oil, and lemongrass oil. It is nontoxic to humans, is an approved food additive, and is commonly used in foods, cosmetics, and pharmaceuticals.

The CDC has licensed patents to two companies to produce an insecticide and an insect repellant. Allylix, of San Diego, California (Now Evolva), is one of these licensees, which has developed an enzyme fermentation process that will produce nootkatone more cost effectively than former processes.

See also 
 Grapefruit mercaptan

References

External links 
 Description of nootkatone at Leffingwell.com

Flavors
Enones
Sesquiterpenes
Decalins
Alkene derivatives